Hans Hinterholzer (23 February 1923 – 2018) was an Austrian alpine skier. He competed in the men's slalom at the 1948 Winter Olympics.

References

1923 births
2018 deaths
Austrian male alpine skiers
Olympic alpine skiers of Austria
Alpine skiers at the 1948 Winter Olympics
Sportspeople from Tyrol (state)
20th-century Austrian people